A coordinatograph is an instrument which mechanically plots X and Y coordinates onto a surface, such as in compiling maps or in plotting control points such as in electronic circuit design.

One historic application of a coordinatograph was a machine that precisely placed and cut rubylith to create photomasks for early integrated circuits including some of the earliest generations of the modern PC microprocessor. The coordinatograph produced layout would then be photographically reduced 100:1 to create the production photomask.

See also
 Cartography
 Cartometry
 Photolithography
 Etching (microfabrication)
 Design for manufacturability
 Semiconductor device fabrication

References

External links
 https://www.cnet.com/news/intels-accidental-revolution states rubylith was used on the Intel 4004.
 http://encyclopedia2.thefreedictionary.com/Coordinatograph defines a coordinatograph in general terms.
 http://ieeexplore.ieee.org/xpl/freeabs_all.jsp?arnumber=4023420 describes a modern version of the coordinatograph.

Lithography (microfabrication)
Microtechnology
Semiconductor device fabrication
Semiconductor fabrication equipment